Gamma-glutamyl carboxylase is an enzyme that in humans is encoded by the GGCX gene, located on chromosome 2 at 2p12.

Function

Gamma-glutamyl carboxylase is an enzyme that catalyzes the posttranslational modification of vitamin K-dependent proteins. Many of these vitamin K-dependent proteins are involved in coagulation so the function of the encoded enzyme is essential for hemostasis.  Most gla domain-containing proteins depend on this carboxylation reaction for posttranslational modification.  In humans, the gamma-glutamyl carboxylase enzyme is most highly expressed in the liver.

Catalytic reaction
Gamma-glutamyl carboxylase oxidizes Vitamin K hydroquinone to Vitamin K 2,3 epoxide, while simultaneously adding CO2 to protein-bound glutamic acid (abbreviation = Glu) to form gamma-carboxyglutamic acid (also called gamma-carboxyglutamate, abbreviation = Gla). Presence of two carboxylate groups causes chelation of Ca2+ , resulting in change in tertiary structure of protein and its activation. The carboxylation reaction will only proceed if the carboxylase enzyme is able to oxidize vitamin K hydroquinone to vitamin K epoxide at the same time; the carboxylation and epoxidation reactions are said to be coupled reactions.

Clinical significance

Mutations in this gene are associated with vitamin K-dependent coagulation defect and PXE-like disorder with multiple coagulation factor deficiency.

See also
 Carboxyglutamate

References

Further reading

External links
 

EC 6.4